José María Avilés (or: Avilez) is a province in the western parts of the Bolivian department of Tarija.

Location
Avilés province is one of six provinces in the Tarija Department. It is located between 21° 28' and 22° 05' south and between 64° 29' and 65° 25' west.

The province borders Eustaquio Méndez Province in the north, Potosí Department in the west, Argentina in the south, Aniceto Arce Province in the south-east, and Cercado Province in the north-east.

The province extends over 85 km from north to south, and 115 km from east to west.

Population
Main idiom of the province is Spanish.

The population increased from 16,210 inhabitants (1992 census) to 17,504 (2001 census), an increase of 8.0%. - 47.6% of the population are younger than 15 years old.

81.6% of the population have no access to electricity, 82.9% have no sanitary facilities (1992).

77.0% of the population are employed in agriculture, 0.1% in mining, 3.7% in industry, 19.2% in general services (2001).

93.9% of the population are Catholics, 4.6% are Protestants (1992).

Division
The province comprises two municipalities:
Uriondo Municipality
Yunchará Municipality

Places of interest 
 Cordillera de Sama Biological Reserve
 Tariquía Flora and Fauna National Reserve

External links
General map of province
Detailed map of province towns and rivers
Population data (Spanish)

Provinces of Tarija Department